Gwenyth Anne Yarker   is a British curator. She is the Honorary Curator of Fine Art at the Dorset County Museum.

Career
Yarker began her curatorial career following undergraduate study at the Open University and postgraduate research at the Courtauld Institute of Art.

Yarker became honorary curator of Fine Art at the Dorset County Museum in the 1990s. In 2011 she curated a major exhibition of British portraits titled "Georgian Faces: Portrait of a County". She is also a trustee of the Dorset Natural History and Archaeological Society, who are closely associated with the museum.

Yarker is a Fellow of the Royal Historical Society. She was elected as a Fellow of the Society of Antiquaries of London on 11 November 2005.

In the 2013 New Year Honours list she was awarded the British Empire Medal for services to museums. This was presented to her in May 2013 by Valerie Pitt-Rivers, the Lord Lieutenant of Dorset.

Select publications
Down, P., Stich, R. and Yarker, G. 2014. Dorset Woman at War : Mabel Stobart and the retreat from Serbia 1915. Dorchester, Dorset Natural History & Archaeological Society.
Yarker, G. 2013. Inquisitive eyes: slade painters in Edwardian Wessex. Bristol, Sansom & Co.
Yarker, G. 2010. Georgian faces : portrait of a county. Dorchester, Dorset Natural History & Archaeological Society.
Yarker, G. 2008. "Three Rackett family portraits by George Romney", Transactions of the Romney Society. 4-15.

References

External links
2011 Exhibition: Georgian Faces-Portrait of a County at the Dorset County Museum presented by Gwenyth Yarker

Living people
Year of birth missing (living people)
Place of birth missing (living people)
Fellows of the Society of Antiquaries of London
Fellows of the Royal Historical Society
Recipients of the British Empire Medal
Alumni of the Open University
Alumni of the Courtauld Institute of Art
British art curators
British women curators